Au Train Island is an island off the southern shore of Lake Superior. The island is located in Au Train Township, Alger County, Michigan. The island lies a little over a mile from the Upper Peninsula shoreline, adjacent to the community of Rock River. The island is off access to the public and is privately owned.

References

Islands of Lake Superior in Michigan
Alger County, Michigan
Private islands of Michigan
Private islands of the Great Lakes